The respiratory rate is the rate at which breathing occurs; it is set and controlled by the respiratory center of the brain. A person's respiratory rate is usually measured in breaths per minute.

Measurement

The respiratory rate in humans is measured by counting the number of breaths for one minute through counting how many times the chest rises.  A fibre-optic breath rate sensor can be used for monitoring patients during a magnetic resonance imaging scan. Respiration rates may increase with fever, illness, or other medical conditions.

Inaccuracies in respiratory measurement have been reported in the literature. One study compared respiratory rate counted using a 90-second count period, to a full minute, and found significant differences in the rates..  Another study found that rapid respiratory rates in babies, counted using a stethoscope, were 60–80% higher than those counted from beside the cot without the aid of the stethoscope. Similar results are seen with animals when they are being handled and not being handled—the invasiveness of touch apparently is enough to make significant changes in breathing.

Various other methods to measure respiratory rate are commonly used, including impedance pneumography, and capnography which are commonly implemented in patient monitoring. In addition, novel techniques for automatically monitoring respiratory rate using wearable sensors are in development, such as estimation of respiratory rate from the electrocardiogram, photoplethysmogram, or accelerometry signals.

There are also modern applications that allow accurate respiratory rate measurement.

Breathing rate is often interchanged with the term breathing frequency. However, this should not be considered the frequency of breathing because realistic breathing signal is composed of many frequencies.

Normal range
For humans, the typical respiratory rate for a healthy adult at rest is 12–15 breaths per minute. The respiratory center sets the quiet respiratory rhythm at around two seconds for an inhalation and three seconds exhalation. This gives the lower of the average rate at 12 breaths per minute.

Average resting respiratory rates by age are:
 birth to 6 weeks: 30–40 breaths per minute 
 6 months: 25–40 breaths per minute
 3 years: 20–30 breaths per minute
 6 years: 18–25 breaths per minute
 10 years: 17–23 breaths per minute
 Adults: 15–18 breaths per minute
 50 years: 18-25 breaths per minute
 Elderly ≥ 65 years old: 12–28 breaths per minute.
 Elderly ≥ 80 years old: 10-30 breaths per minute.

Minute volume 
Respiratory minute volume is the volume of air which is inhaled (inhaled minute volume) or exhaled (exhaled minute volume) from the lungs in one minute.

Diagnostic value
The value of respiratory rate as an indicator of potential respiratory dysfunction has been investigated but findings suggest it is of limited value.

One study found that only 33% of people presenting to an emergency department with an oxygen saturation below 90% had an increased respiratory rate. An evaluation of respiratory rate for the differentiation of the severity of illness in babies under 6 months found it not to be very useful. Approximately half of the babies had a respiratory rate above 50 breaths per minute, thereby questioning the value of having a "cut-off" at 50 breaths per minute as the indicator of serious respiratory illness.

It has also been reported that factors such as crying, sleeping, agitation and age have a significant influence on the respiratory rate. As a result of these and similar studies the value of respiratory rate as an indicator of serious illness is limited.

Nonetheless, respiratory rate is widely used to monitor the physiology of acutely-ill hospital patients. It is measured regularly to facilitate identification of changes in physiology along with other vital signs. This practice has been widely adopted as part of early warning systems.

Abnormal respiratory rates

See also 
Subparabrachial nucleus - nucleus in the brain stem that regulates breathing rate
Respiratory system
Heart rate and pulse and systolic and diastolic blood pressure measurements and the level of oxygen saturation- some other vital signs- can provide related information about the heart and lungs and the great vessels, since these systems work with one another, are relatively close together in gross (macroscopic) anatomy, and are physiologically very related.

References 

Respiratory physiology
Respiratory therapy
Temporal rates